Goariva is a village in the Carhaix-Plouguer commune in the Finistère department in north-western France.

Overview
Goariva is also the name assigned to Lock 192 on the Nantes-Brest canal. This is the last lock on the currently navigable western section of the canal and it is located close to the old town of Carhaix-Plouguer.   As well as being on the Nantes-Brest Blueway, the lock is on the V6 Greenway (close to the intersections with the V1 and V7).

See also
Communes of the Finistère department

Villages in Brittany